Gollijeh-ye Olya (also Romanized as Gollījeh-ye ‘Olyā; also known as Golījeh, Goljeh, Gollījeh, Gollījeh-ye Emām (Persian: گليجه امام), Gollūjeh, Guludzhan, and Gulūja) is a village in Bonab Rural District, in the Central District of Zanjan County, Zanjan Province, Iran. At the 2006 census, its population was 41, in 13 families.

References 

Populated places in Zanjan County